"My Night to Howl" is a song recorded by American country music artist Lorrie Morgan.  It was released in March 1994 as the first single from the album War Paint.  The song reached number 31 on the Billboard Hot Country Singles & Tracks chart.  The song was written by Charlie Black, Austin Roberts and Rick Giles.

Critical reception
A review of the song in Billboard was favorable, stating that "Morgan unleashes her full feline fury against a driving beat, purring organ, and wahwah guitar. Another satisfying side from a singer who's on a roll." Richard McVey of Cashbox was less favorable, writing that it "has Morgan's great vocals, but that's all. The song says nothing new lyrically."

Chart performance

References

1994 singles
1994 songs
Lorrie Morgan songs
Songs written by Charlie Black
Songs written by Rick Giles
Songs written by Austin Roberts (singer)
Song recordings produced by Richard Landis
BNA Records singles